Daniel Kottke is an American businessman known for being a college friend of Steve Jobs and one of the first employees of Apple Inc.

Early life and education
Kottke was born on April 4, 1954, in Bronxville, New York.

Kottke first met Steve Jobs when they were both undergraduates at Reed College in 1972. In 1974, Kottke and Jobs made a trek in search of spiritual enlightenment to India to visit Neem Karoli Baba at his Kainchi ashram. When they got to the Neem Karoli ashram, it was almost deserted because Neem Karoli Baba had died in September 1973. They then made a long trek up a dry riverbed to an ashram of Haidakhan Babaji.

After returning from India, Kottke transferred to Columbia University in 1975 as a literature and music major. He stayed in touch with Jobs and they traveled together to fellow Reed College classmate Robert Friedland's All One Farm.

Career

Apple
During his junior year at Columbia in 1976, Kottke was asked by Jobs to become involved in a hobbyist computer project where he assembled and tested the boards during the summer. He also arranged for Kottke to work "for an hourly rate part-time assembling circuit boards for a company called Call Computer" that didn't require technical expertise. It was during that summer that Kottke realized his own interest in computers. Kottke stated in an interview with KQED/PBS that both he and Jobs's sister Patty (who was also assembling boards while watching TV) were the first part-time employees of Apple, while Bill Fernandez was the first full-time employee.

In 1977, after graduating from Columbia, Kottke joined Apple as full-time employee #12. It was at that time that Jobs, Kottke, and Jobs's girlfriend Chrisann Brennan shared a house near the Apple office in Cupertino.

Kottke spent an additional eight years with Apple debugging Apple II printed circuit boards and building Apple III and Macintosh prototypes as well as working on the design for the Macintosh keyboard. The Apple II gained a sizable amount of popularity, eventually becoming one of the best selling personal computers of the 1970s and early 1980s.
Kottke was also one of the original members of the Macintosh development team and his signature can be found embossed on the internal wall of early production Macintosh computers.

Jobs, however, refused to grant Kottke stock in the new company, stating that he "will give him zero" (co-founder Steve Wozniak would later give Daniel some of his own shares in Apple). In her memoir of her life with Jobs, Chrisann Brennan states that she later asked Kottke about not receiving the stock options and that he replied: "Oh that ... Steve had offered me a job in marketing ... but I wasn't interested in marketing because I had something like a fever to understand the technology ... so I never pursued the marketing opportunity."

In addition, in 1982 when Time magazine featured a major, but unflattering, profile of Jobs, he publicly "berated" Kottke for confirming the fact to Time that he had a daughter, Lisa Brennan.

Representations in film

Documentaries
 Steve Jobs: The Man in the Machine (2015)

Feature films
 Pirates of Silicon Valley (1999), with Marcus Giamatti as Kottke:
In an interview with Slashdot, Kottke stated that Pirates of Silicon Valley was "a great movie. Noah Wyle was just uncannily close to Jobs. Just unbelievable. I found myself thinking it was actually Steve on the screen." He also stated that in the film there were "all these scenes of the garage where it's like half a dozen people working, busily carrying things back and forth, and oscilloscopes" when he [Kottke] "was really the only person who worked in the garage. Woz would show up once a week with his latest to test it out, and Steve Jobs was on the phone a lot in the kitchen."

 Jobs (2013), with Lukas Haas as Kottke:
In an interview with Slashdot, Kottke stated that he was consulted on early versions of the screenplay for Jobs and noted, "Ashton's very good. I have no complaints with him at all, no complaints with his portrayal of Jobs. The complaint that people would rightly have about the film is that it portrays Woz as not having the same vision as Steve Jobs, which is really unfair." He also said that the early versions of the screenplay "were painful. Really painful. I forwarded the first draft to Mike Markkula because they wanted his feedback, and Mike took such a bad reaction to it, he wouldn't have anything more to do with the project. By the time it got to the fourth draft, it was okay. It wasn't making me cringe." Kottke also outlined various areas that were both accurate and inaccurate in the film. Bill Fernandez was part of the same interview but stated that he didn't see the film because "the whole thing is a work of fiction, and I don't want to be upset by all the things that the screenwriter has invented and don't represent the truth." Kottke responded that he didn't think of the film as fiction because "I was involved early on in the film, and they really, sincerely tried to make it as accurate as they could."

In the same interview, Bill Fernandez and Kottke commented on the characterization of Rod Holt (portrayed by actor Ron Eldard). Kottke disputed the characterization, noting that: "What completely cracked us all up is the scene where Rod arrives for the first time. Rod comes up wearing leathers, riding up on a motorcycle with long hair ... he's like this motorcycle dude. It just cracked us all up." Fernandez, who had not seen the film at the time of the interview, was also surprised by this portrayal. Holt, however, (according to Kottke), "thought it was hilarious." As for why he may have been characterized this way, Kottke states that, "Rod was really into dirt bikes. And I never saw him riding one, but he talked about it all the time. So the author just had him riding up on a motorcycle. I liked that guy. I met him on the set. I had no idea who he was when I met him because he doesn't look at all like Rod, he has long straight hair and he's wearing leathers." Fernandez, who was equally amused by this vision of Holt responded by asking, "Who could this possibly be in the Apple universe? ... It seems to me that there's a lot of fan fiction about Apple Computer and about Steve Jobs, and I think that this is the biggest, flashiest piece of fan fiction that there's been to date."

The TV show John Wants Answers took Steve Wozniak, Kottke, and Andy Hertzfeld through the film scene by scene and discussed how the events actually occurred.

 Steve Jobs (2015), mentioned in dialogue.

In an interview with CNN, Kottke states that seeing the movie was a bit of a shock to him and that he enjoyed it very much. "It took me a few days after seeing the film ... I was surprised to see what a dominant character Lisa became. I found that very gratifying to see. It was very much a caricature ... [but] Aaron Sorkin did such a good job."

References

External links 

 Edwards, Jim. These Pictures Of Apple's First Employees Are Absolutely Wonderful – Business Insider, December 26, 2013.
 Mac@30 Rod Holt, Daniel Kottke and Woz discuss Early Apple, Macintosh Anniversary, January 27, 2014.

American computer businesspeople
American computer programmers
American computer scientists
Engineers from California
Apple Inc. employees
Place of birth missing (living people)
Apple II family
Computer designers
Living people
People from Palo Alto, California
Reed College alumni
Columbia College (New York) alumni
1954 births